Raymond Leslie Wheeler RDI FRAeS FRINA (25 October 1927 – 25 June 2019) was a British engineer who was instrumental in Britain's successful development of rocket launchers and hovercraft.

Early life
He was born in Mill Hill, in Middlesex. He attended Newport County Secondary Grammar School (now Carisbrooke College).

From the University College, Southampton he gained a BSc in Engineering in 1948.

Career

Saunders-Roe
He joined Saunders-Roe in 1945 as an apprentice. He worked on the SR.N1, the first hovercraft. He eventually became Chief Structural Engineer, working on the 300-tonne SR.N4 hovercraft, as Project Engineer.

At Saunders-Roe he worked with Roy Dommett on the Black Arrow rocket programme, where he was the Chief Designer. Although entirely successful, built on a limited budget, the project came to an abrupt end in November 1971, having been cancelled on 29 July 1971.

British Hovercraft Corporation
From 1966 to 1985 he was Chief Designer of the British Hovercraft Corporation, and Technical Director from 1972 to 1985.

He became a Fellow of the Royal Aeronautical Society in 1974. In 1995 he became an RDI.

Personal life
He married in Southampton in 1950 and has one son (born 1956) and two daughters (born 1952 and 1954). He was a keen field hockey player for the company teams. He lived at East Cowes.

His funeral was at 1pm on Friday 19 July 2019 at East Cowes Methodist Church.

References

External links
 British science

Video clips
 BBC Great Egg Race 1985
 

1927 births
Alumni of the University of Southampton
East Cowes
English aerospace engineers
Fellows of the Royal Aeronautical Society
People from Cowes
People from Mill Hill
Saunders-Roe
Space programme of the United Kingdom
2019 deaths